St. John's University (SJU) is a higher education institution in Tamsui District, New Taipei, Taiwan. It is the successor institution of the former St. John's University, Shanghai and St. Mary's Hall, Shanghai. Two well-known educational institutions, they were founded in 1879 and 1918, respectively, by Bishop John Schereschewsky of the American Episcopal Church. 

History
In 1952, the Chinese Communists forced St. John's University in Shanghai to give up its name and merge with other universities. In response to the loss of the school's identity, a group of distinguished alumni in Taiwan resolved to restore their alma mater in Taipei. In 1961, with the approval of the American Episcopal Church in Taiwan, the alumni of St. John's University, in conjunction with the alumnae of the former St. Mary's Hall of Shanghai, enthusiastically donated money to purchase land in the town of Tamsui in Taipei County for the school campus.

In 1967, The Ministry of Education authorized the school to open as a five-year junior college of Industry and named it after its location, Hsin-pu (新埔). Nonetheless, its English name—St. John's & St. Mary's Institute of Technology—continued to honor the history and traditions of the alumni's two illustrious alma maters. In 1993, the school was accredited as an Institute of Business and Industry; and then, because of its excellent educational reputation, upgraded its status to an Institute of Technology in 1999. After decades of work to fulfill the aspirations of its alumni at home and abroad, the school's official Chinese name was changed on October 10, 2003, from 新埔技術學院 (Hsinpu Institute of Technology) to 聖約翰技術學院 (St. John's & St. Mary's Institute of Technology). On August 1, 2005, after constant and collective efforts, the school was officially upgraded to a University of Science and Technology, and was able to restore its original school name, St. John's University (SJU).

The founder of the school was Dr. James C. L. Wong, the first Chinese Bishop of the Taiwan Episcopal Church. Dr. Vivien Yen was the school's first president, and Bishop James C. L. Wong was its first board chairman. The succeeding chairpersons have been Dr. George K. C. Yeh( Acting Chair); Bishop James T. M. Pong; and, since 1972, Dr. Cecilia Koo. Past presidents, in addition to Dr. Yen, were Bishop James Pong, Professor William Yue-Jen Hsia, Dr. Yeh Chi-Tung, and Dr. Andrew C. Chang. Dr. Peter Tuen-Ho Yang has served as president since August 1, 2002.

In 2019, the university had an enrollment rate of 43.10%.

Academic departments
College of Engineering
 Master's Program in Industrial Engineering and Management
 Department of Industrial Engineering and Management
 Department of Mechanical and Computer Aided Engineering
 Graduate School of Automation and Mechatronics
College of Electrical-Electronic and Computer Engineering
 Master's Program in Electrical Engineering
 Department of Electrical Engineering
 Master's Program in Electronic Engineering
 Department of Electronic Engineering
 Department of Computer Science and Information Engineering
 Department of Computer and Communication Engineering
College of Business and Management
 Department of Information Management
 Department of Business Administration
 Department of International Business
 Department of Finance
 Department of Marketing and Logistics Management
 Department of Fashion Administration & Management (The first one and the only one fashion management department in Taiwan)
College of Humanities and Social Sciences
 Department of Applied English
 Department of Digital Literature and Arts
 Department of Leisure Sports and Health Management

Research Laboratories

Precision Instrument Center

The Precision Instrument Center (PIC) of St. John's University was founded on April 26, 2006 with the purposes of improving teaching quality and promoting high-tech researching calibers. The PIC has integrated Opto-Mechatronics Research Center(OMRC) and High Speed Circuit Board(HSPCB) Research Center of this school, it is installed with valued instruments and equipment (Clean Room and Sputter are donated by alumnus) to support teaching and the R&D works for the academic and industrial users.
The PIC is part of the Department of Mechanical and Computer Aided Engineering; Dr. Rwei-Ching Chang is the dean.

Research Focus:

Education Programs Offered
 Semiconductor Technology Program
 Electric Properties Measuring and Testing Program
 Physical Properties Measuring and Testing Program
 Micro Mechatronical Technology Program
 Nano Science and Technology Program
 Semiconductor Equipment Program

Research Fields
 High Dielectric oxidize Electric Characteristic Research of Silicon Semiconductor
 Electric Characteristic and Etching Research of Porous Silicon
 Printed Circuit Board Dielectric Material Characteristic Research
 High Frequency Electric Circuit Designing
 Cordless Reception System Making
 Nano Technology Research
 TFT Making and Analysis
 Micro Mechatronical System Making and Analysis

See also
 List of universities in Taiwan
 St. John's College, University of British Columbia, also founded by SJU alumni

References

External links
 Official web site
 Fashion Andministration and Management Department

1967 establishments in Taiwan
Association of Christian Universities and Colleges in Asia
Educational institutions established in 1879
Educational institutions established in 1967
Universities and colleges in New Taipei
1879 establishments in China